The North Harbour women's cricket team was the women's representative cricket team for North Harbour. From 1990–91 to 1993–94 they competed in the New Zealand Pub Charities National Tournament, replacing North Shore. The team merged with Auckland ahead of the 1994–95 season.

History
North Harbour joined the New Zealand Pub Charities National Tournament in 1990–91, replacing North Shore. They finished bottom of the league in their first season, losing all five of their matches.

The following season, they recorded their first win, against Canterbury B, and finished 4th overall. They finished bottom of the group again in 1992–93, but recorded their best finish in 1993–94, placing joint-second in the league stage before losing the semi-final against eventual winners Canterbury. 

Following that season, North Harbour merged with Auckland.

Players

Notable players
Players who played for North Harbour and played internationally are listed below, in order of first international appearance (given in brackets):

 Ingrid Jagersma (1984)
 Maia Lewis (1992)
 Clare Nicholson (1995)
 Helen Daly (1996)

Honours
 Hallyburton Johnstone Shield:
 Winners (0):
 Best finish: Semi-Final (1993–94)

See also
 North Shore women's cricket team
 Auckland Hearts

References

Women's cricket teams in New Zealand
Cricket in Auckland